Rocky River station is a former New York, Chicago and St. Louis Railroad station in Rocky River, Ohio.

It is currently used as a communication and signal department for the Norfolk Southern Railway.

References

1930 establishments in Ohio
Railway stations in the United States opened in 1930
Former New York, Chicago and St. Louis Railroad stations
Former railway stations in Ohio